Keith Wainwright (date of birth unknown) is a former Bermudian cricketer. Wainwright's batting and bowling styles are unknown.

Wainwright made his debut for Bermuda in a List A match against Trinidad and Tobago in the 1998–99 Red Stripe Bowl, and made two further List A appearances in that tournament, against the Windward Islands and Guyana. He scored a total of 15 runs in his three List A matches, at an average of 5.00 and with a high score of 8. With the ball he also took a single wicket.

References

External links
Keith Wainwright at ESPNcricinfo
Keith Wainwright at CricketArchive

Living people
Bermudian cricketers
Year of birth missing (living people)